Anne Bourchier may refer to:
 Anne Bourchier, Baroness Dacre (1470–1530), daughter of Sir Humphrey Bourchier and Elizabeth Tilney
 Anne Bourchier, 7th Baroness Bourchier (1517–1571), daughter of Henry Bourchier, 2nd Earl of Essex, 6th Baron Bourchier
 Lady Anne Bourchier, Countess of Middlesex (born 1631), daughter of Edward Bourchier, 4th Earl of Bath